Town Topics is a free weekly newspaper distributed to households of the New Jersey municipalities of Princeton and parts of Hopewell Borough, Hopewell Township, West Windsor Township, Lawrence Township, Pennington, Montgomery Township, and South Brunswick Township, with an estimated circulation of 15,600.

Town Topics is known for its coverage of Princeton, as well as its coverage of Princeton's largest institution, Princeton University. While news coverage is mostly local, the paper's arts and entertainment coverage is more regional, with a coverage area that covers roughly the Trenton to New Brunswick portion of the Northeast Corridor.

Advertisers also take advantage of Town Topics availability, and the back pages of the newspaper are largely occupied with real estate advertisements.

Emily Stuart helped her husband and other relatives establish a weekly newspaper called Town Topics that has been published in Princeton since 1946.  On April 4, 1989, Stuart, 74, was found stabbed to death in the basement of her Mercer Street home in a quiet neighborhood near Princeton University.  A relative found Stuart's fully clothed body lying face down in a garden tool storage area of the basement.  A rear kitchen door was ajar in Stuart's home, nothing appeared to have been stolen, and Stuart had been stabbed about five times between the shoulder blades.

Town Topics was purchased from the Stuart family by a consortium led by Lynn Adams Smith, together with architect J. Robert Hillier and a small group of former employees.  Town Topics purchased Princeton Magazine in 2008 and in 2012 launched LifeStories Magazine and Urban Agenda.  All publications are now under the umbrella name of Witherspoon Media Group.  Lynn Adams Smith is Editor in Chief of Town Topics, Princeton Magazine, and Urban Agenda.

References

External links
 Princeton Online Website
 Town Topics Web site

Newspapers published in New Jersey
Princeton, New Jersey
Weekly newspapers published in the United States
Publications established in 1946